was a Japanese boxer who competed in the 1932 Summer Olympics. He was eliminated in the quarter-finals of the bantamweight class after losing his fight to the eventual bronze medalist José Villanueva.

References

Bantamweight boxers
Olympic boxers of Japan
Boxers at the 1932 Summer Olympics
1909 births
Year of death missing
Japanese male boxers